Dennis Banda (born 10 December 1988 in Lusaka) is a Zambian football defender for Green Buffaloes in Zambia. He had several proposals to play in the season 2010/11 in Europe or South America where his FIFA agent Marcelo Houseman was working on several deals.
He has played for the senior team on 29 occasions including in World Cup qualifications and in the African Nations Cup.

Dennis is not related to Zambia's president Rupiah Banda.

International career
He played for the Zambian national team and played for his country at the 2007 FIFA U-20 World Cup in Canada.

References 

1988 births
Living people
Sportspeople from Lusaka
Zambian footballers
2010 Africa Cup of Nations players
Association football defenders
Green Buffaloes F.C. players
Zambia international footballers
Zambia A' international footballers
2009 African Nations Championship players